Montmartre (French: Faubourg Montmartre) is a 1931 French drama film directed by Raymond Bernard and starring Gaby Morlay, Line Noro and Florelle. Two sisters struggle to stay above water in the poverty-stricken suburbs of Paris. It was a remake of a 1925 silent film Montmartre that had also starred Morlay.

The film's sets were designed by the art director Jacques Colombier.

Cast
 Gaby Morlay as Ginette Gentilhomme 
 Line Noro as Céline Gentilhomme 
 Florelle as Irène 
 Pauline Carton as Tante Aurélie 
 Nadine Picard as Fernande 
 Odette Barencey as Mme Elise 
 Ketty Pierson as Louise 
 Henriette Leblond as Mme Chouya-Barca 
 Charles Vanel as André Marco, dit Dédé 
 André Dubosc as M. Gentilhomme 
 Antonin Artaud as Follestat 
 Dimitri Dimitriev as L'étranger 
 Pierre Bertin as Frédéric Charençon 
 Paul Azaïs as Un client de Dédé
 Raymond Cordy as Le boulanger du village
 Robert Tourneur as Le gérant

References

Bibliography 
 Dayna Oscherwitz & MaryEllen Higgins. The A to Z of French Cinema. Scarecrow Press, 2009.

External links 
 

1931 films
French drama films
1931 drama films
1930s French-language films
Films directed by Raymond Bernard
Pathé films
French black-and-white films
1930s French films